Johann Theodor of Bavaria (3 September 1703 – 27 January 1763) was  a cardinal, Prince-Bishop of Regensburg, Prince-Bishop of Freising, and Prince-Bishop of Liège.

Early life
Johann Theodor was a son of Elector Maximilian II Emanuel of Bavaria and of his wife Theresa Kunegunda Sobieska (daughter of King John III Sobieski of Poland).  He was educated at the University of Ingolstadt in Bavaria and at the University of Siena.

Ecclesiastical career
Johann Theodor was elected bishop of Regensburg by its cathedral chapter on 29 July 1719, at age 15. The election received papal confirmation 14 October 1721.  He was elected coadjutor bishop of Freising by its cathedral chapter on 5 November 1723.  The election received papal confirmation on 12 April 1726, and he was permitted to retain the see of Regensburg.

Johann Theodor was ordained subdeacon in 1724.  He was ordained priest on 8 April 1730.  After receiving a papal dispensation on 4 August 1730 to receive episcopal consecration before the canonically required age (he was only 27 years old), he was consecrated bishop on 1 October 1730, in the cathedral of Münster, by his brother Clemens August of Bavaria, Archbishop and Elector of Cologne, assisted by Johann Adolf von Horde, titular bishop of Flaviopoli, and by Ferdinand Oesterhof, titular bishop of Agatonice.

On 9 September 1743 Johann Theodor was created a Cardinal-Priest by Pope Benedict XIV, but his name was reserved in pectore and was not announced until 17 January 1746.  On 27 April 1746 he received the cardinalatial title of San Lorenzo in Panisperna.

On 23 January 1744 Johann Theodor was elected Prince-Bishop of Liège by the cathedral chapter. The election received papal confirmation 12 February 1744, and he was permitted to retain the sees of Regensburg and Freising.

Johann Theodor did not participate in the conclave of 1758 following the death of Pope Benedict XIV. He was the last representative of the Wittelsbach family to occupy the bishopric of Liège. In March 1761, shortly after the death of his elder brother Clemens August, Pope Clement XIII rejected his succession as Archbishop and Elector of Cologne because the pope entertained some doubt as to Johann Theodor's moral conduct.

Johann Theodor was known as a great hunter, patron of music (he played the violoncello) and theatre, and held a splendid court at Liège. He was said to have had affairs with several women despite his clerical status and was liked by the inhabitants of the bishopric. Asthmatic and tubercular, he gave into the advice of his doctor, a physician named Steppler (a German from Munich), who claimed that his sickness originated from coal vapours. He thus went for regular stays in Germany, though this did not improve his health.

Death
Johann Theodor died on 27 January 1763, in Liège, Belgium. He was buried in Saint-Lambert Cathedral in Liège while his heart was placed in the Chapel of Grace in the Shrine of Our Lady of Altötting.

References

Sources
A. De Bryun, Anciennes houillères de la région liégeoises, Dricot, Liège, 1988.

House of Wittelsbach
Prince-Bishops of Liège
Roman Catholic Prince-Bishops of Freising
18th-century German cardinals
18th-century Roman Catholic bishops in Bavaria
1703 births
1763 deaths
Sons of monarchs